Gabbett is a surname. The name is an alternative spelling of the British surname 'Gabbot', whose origins are uncertain but is either the diminutive of the given name Gabriel (ie, 'son of Gabriel') or, alternatively, came to Britain in the 11th century during the Norman conquest in the form of the French name "Gabet".  The surname Gabbett was first brought to County Limerick in Ireland in 1487. By the 17th century, the Gabbetts were a prominent landowning family in Limerick. The Gabbett's dynastic wealth was decimated during Ireland's Great Potato Famine in the 1800s, after which time emigration spread the name to Australia and North America during the 19th and early 20th centuries.

Notable people
Daniel Fitzgerald Gabbett (1841–1898), Irish politician
Edward Gabbett (1841–1912), Irish Catholic priest and Archdeacon of Limerick
Michael Terrence Gabbett, Australian clinical geneticist
Peter Gabbett (born 1941), English decathlete
Todd Gabbett (1942–2021), American football player and coach

Fiction
Matthew Gabbett, a protagonist in Marcus Clarke's semi-fictional novel For the Term of His Natural Life

See also
Gabbert

References